Robinson 2011 was the fourteenth season of the Swedish version of Survivor and had its premiere on 29 August 2011. Paolo Roberto returned to host this season.

Like the previous season, this season did not have a jury vote to decide the winner. Instead, it was a final challenge where Mats Kemi became the winner against runners-up Ola Ahlgren and Hanna Nygren.

Contestants

The Total Votes is the number of votes a castaway has received during Tribal Councils where the castaway is eligible to be voted out of the game. It does not include the votes received during the final Tribal Council.

 The four women who entered later (Denicé, Lisa, Petra and Viktoriya) competed in a "tribe leader" challenge, where the winner would be the tribe leader of Kalinga and got to choose one of the other women to join her. The other two who weren't chosen (Lisa and Viktoriya) competed for the tribe leadership in Bontoc.

 After Kalinga won the second Reward Challenge, their tribe leader Denicé went to a Philippine prison where the men were held and got to choose one of the men to join her as a new tribemate. She chose Love.

 Michaela from Kalinga and Sana from Bontoc were chosen as sacrifices for the fourth Reward Challenge. The winner would be choosing one of the men to join her tribe while the loser would be eliminated. Michaela, who won the challenge, later chose Johan to join Kalinga.

 The tribe leaders (Denicé and Viktoriya) faced off in the fifth Reward Challenge. The winner would get to choose two more men to join her tribe, while the loser would get the men who weren't chosen.

Results overview
The tribes originally consisted of only women and they had to compete for the opportunity to draft men. Before the tribes were formed, four women quit and one was medically evacuated for a cerebral haemorrhage. Another three quit before the merge, though one was for a legitimate reason (family emergency), and another quit after the merge. Because of the high drop-out rate, two tribal councils were declared null and void, allowing two eliminated players to return. When episode nine began, there had still only been two tribal councils and all in all, there were only six tribal councils in the season. All attempts at serious alliances failed and it became taboo to have such conversations. There were of course agreements between individuals, spoken or not, to never vote for each other. Votes were based on different criteria each tribal council. Before the merge, the criterion was simply strength in challenges. After the merge, three were voted out because they were untrustworthy. One was voted out because she won a challenge. In a mid-season twist, every player from both tribes had to vote for the man and woman they most thought deserved to win the game. The ones with the most votes were Hanna and Mats. Hanna was a likable girl praised for her positive attitude, survival skill, likability and tendency to support everyone. Mats was an older policeman, known for his strong morals, leadership and survival skills. He won a whole pig for his tribe but gave a third of it to the other tribe. Places in the final were decided by competitions starting at the final six. Half a season from the deservedness vote, Hanna and Mats won the two final spots. The jury also got to vote in a third finalist and unanimously selected Ola, a man praised for his humour and constantly positive attitude. The jury also got to penalize players in the final by placing weights on them. Mats got the least weight and he won the final multi-stage obstacle course by a good margin.

In the case of multiple tribes or castaways who win reward or immunity, they are listed in order of finish, or alphabetically where it was a team effort; where one castaway won and invited others, the invitees are in brackets.

 The Tribal Council in the beginning of the fifth episode were cancelled. Instead of losing a tribemate (which would have been Michaela), they received a punishment because of Sophie and Hanna S.'s departure.

Episode Quotes
Translations of the original Swedish episode quotes are listed here:
"I had high heels... I didn't have any goddamn good panties... nothing at all. But I just had to give it my all!"
"It feels like they are intruders in our territory... I hate when someone says you should do this or you should do that!"
"Believe it or not... But I undress myself naked."
"Men are hunters and women are feeders..."
"We are very different. He is a cop... but we love each other."
"Many of them have psychopathic traits and that bastard has it..."
"Eh... it doesn't feel that good to be dumb..."
"There is a lot of people here who are under thirty and they don't seem to understand this thing called work..."
"I'm not going to risk my life looking for some damn bananas..."
"The mood was already as low it could be... but of course it wasn't, it was possible to bring down the mood even a little lower..."
"Mats five and a half years old playing cop..."
"You damn little skeleton, I'm the one in charge here. You should listen now, damn it..."
"I felt like a lost bird, I didn't know where I would fly..."

Voting history

 Because of the tied vote between Fatima and Sigvald, they had to compete in a duel to decide who would be eliminated from the game.

 Four eliminated contestants came back to vote someone of the remaining contestants into the finale, alongside Hanna N. and Mats. All of the contestants besides the finalists could vote, and they could only vote for either Louise, Ola or Sigvald.

References

External links
http://www.tv4.se/robinson

 2011
2011 Swedish television seasons